The 2008 South African Figure Skating Championships were held at the Festival Ice Rink in Kempton Park from 30 September through 3 October 2007. Skaters competed in the disciplines of men's and ladies' singles at the senior, novice, and pre-novice levels. There was also a junior and juvenile ladies' competition.

Senior results

Men

Ladies

Junior results

Ladies

Novice results

Men

Ladies

Pre-novice results

Boys

Girls

Juvenile results

Girls

External links
 2008 South African Championships results

South African Figure Skating Championships, 2008
South African Figure Skating Championships
Figure Skating Championships, 2008
South African Figure Skating Championship
South African Figure Skating Championship